Hellín Deportivo is a Spanish football team based in Hellín, Province of Albacete, in the autonomous community of Castile-La Mancha. Founded in 1989 it plays in Tercera División Group 18, holding home matches at Estadio Santa Ana, with a 3,000-seat capacity.

Season to season

18 seasons in Tercera División

Famous players
 Rony Beard
 Rodolfo Bodipo
 Juan Antonio Chesa
 Josico

Kit
Standard: dark blue shirt, white shorts and socks.
Alternative: yellow shirt, dark blue shorts and white socks.

External links
Official website  
Futbolme team profile  

 
 

Football clubs in Castilla–La Mancha
Association football clubs established in 1989
Defunct football clubs in Castilla–La Mancha